The 16th African Championships in Athletics was held in Addis Ababa, the capital city of Ethiopia, from April 30 to May 4, 2008. The competition venue was the Addis Ababa Stadium. It is the largest Athletics event held in Ethiopia to date. It was the first time in its then 29-year history the African Championships in Athletics were held in Eastern Africa, despite the region's well-documented success in long-distance running.

In the men's 100 m, Nigerians Olusoji Fasuba and Uchenna Emedolu repeated the places from the 2006 edition. On April 30, there was a 35-minute delay to the men's 10,000 metres due to weather, but the Ethiopians dominated the podium and the race, with the missed absence of world champion Kenenisa Bekele.

Men's results

Track

Field

Women's results

Track

Field

Medals table

Participating nations

 (11)
 (3)
 (14)
 (10)
 (7)
 (22)
 (1)
 (1)
 (10)
 (1)
 (10)
 (9)
 (6)
 (18)
 (86)
 (1)
 (5)
 (22)
 (9)
 (39)
 (3)
 (4)
 (1)
 (2)
 (10)
 (9)
 (29)
 (5)
 (7)
 (45)
 (7)
 (13)
 (12)
 (2)
 (8)
 (55)
 (15)
 (4)
 (5)
 (12)
 (7)
 (3)

See also
2008 in athletics (track and field)

References
Results (archived)

External links 
  (archived)
Official results

 
A
A
African Championships in Athletics
African Championships in Athletics
Sport in Addis Ababa
21st century in Addis Ababa
International athletics competitions hosted by Ethiopia